BBC Igbo is the Igbo language service of BBC World Service meant primarily for the Igbo-speaking communities in the south-east, South-south of Nigeria and Igbo people in diaspora It is part of the 12 new language services added to the BBC services and  the other languages are Afaan Oromo, Amharic, Gujarati, Yoruba, Korean, Marathi, Pidgin, Punjabi, Telugu and Tigrinya.

History 
BBC Igbo was launched on 19 February 2018  by the BBC. This was part of the expansion project that accommodated additional  twelve new languages. The services was funded by the  United Kingdom Government through the Foreign and Commonwealth Office (FCO) with an investment of 289 million pounds. This expansion  is called the BBC biggest expansion since the 1940's and the achievement of BBC Hausa that was introduced sixty years ago brought about the introduction of Igbo language. Tony Hall, the BBC Director General remarked that: 
Also, the BBC head of West Africa, Oluwatoyosi Ogunseye explain the importance of adding more local languages to the BBC services. He said that:

Broadcasting
The BBC Igbo was first aired with an interview  with the wife of Biafra Separatist, Nnamdi Kanu.The news outlet will report news from a fair point of view in addition with trending topics in sports, entertainment, business, health, education and women purely in the Igbo language.The Editorial Lead of the project, Peter Okwoche  explained that:   

Also, there is a 60-second audio summary of the activities of the BBC Igbo on BBC Minute twice daily.

Lastly, the broadcasting operation is fully digital  and it includes interesting short format audio, video, graphics and illustrations.

Media centre 
The BBC Bureau in Lagos state is the headquarters of  the BBC Igbo  and other two new services; BBC Pidgin and BBC Yoruba. The bureau was commissioned in March 2018 following the establishment of additional three new Languages in Nigeria. It consists of a TV studio, two radio stations and it can accommodate up to 200 people. It is also known as the headquarters for BBC in West Africa.

Jamie Angus, Director of the BBC World Service, was available during the commissioning of the bureau and he said that:

See also 

BBC Urdu
BBC Persian
BBC Bangla
BBC Somali
BBC Hausa
BBC Yoruba

References

BBC News channels
BBC World Service foreign language